Tritonoturris cumingii is a species of sea snail, a marine gastropod mollusk in the family Raphitomidae.

Description
The length of the shell varies between 11 mm and 40 mm

The ribs are slightly nodulous. The columella is spirally plaited. The siphonal canal is very short and slightly recurved. The outer lip is somewhat thin, without external varix. The sinus is small and distinct. The color of the shell is pale orange-brown with small deeper colored spots. The revolving striae are white.

Distribution
This marine species occurs in the Red Sea and off Mauritius, the Philippines and French Polynesia.

References

External links
  Powell A.W.B.(1966) The molluscan families Speightiidae and Turridae: an evaluation of the valid taxa, both recent and fossil, with lists of characteristic species; Bulletin of the Auckland Institute and Museum ; no. 5
  Kay, E. A. (1979). Hawaiian marine shells. Reef and shore fauna of Hawaii. Section 4: Mollusca. Bernice P. Bishop Museum Special Publications. 64xviii + 1-653
 Moretzsohn, Fabio, and E. Alison Kay. "HAWAIIAN MARINE MOLLUSCS." (1995)
  Powell A.W.B.(1966) The molluscan families Speightiidae and Turridae: an evaluation of the valid taxa, both recent and fossil, with lists of characteristic species; Bulletin of the Auckland Institute and Museum ; no. 5
 
 Gastropods.com: Tritonoturris cumingii

cumingii
Gastropods described in 1835